Yatar-Ami was a king of Carchemish proposed to have reigned between 1766 and 1764 BCE.

Son of Aplahanda, he enjoyed a brief reign of only two years before being succeeded by Yahdun-Lim. He is known to have continued the profitable lumber trade with Mari.

References

18th-century BC rulers
Kings of Carchemish